The 2013 Belarusian First League is the 23rd season of 2nd level football in Belarus. It started in April and finished in November 2013.

Team changes from 2012 season
The winners of last season (Dnepr Mogilev) were promoted to Belarusian Premier League. No teams relegated directly from the Premier League as it was expanded from 11 to 12 teams.

The runners-up of last season (Gorodeya) lost the promotion/relegation play-off to Torpedo-BelAZ Zhodino (11th-placed Premier League team) and both clubs stayed in their respective leagues.

One team that finished at the bottom of 2012 season table (Rudensk) relegated to the Second League. To compensate for Premier League and First League club withdrawals from last year, they were replaced by three best teams of 2012 Second League (Smolevichi-STI, Slonim and Isloch Minsk Raion) and the league was expanded from 15 to 16 clubs.

DSK Gomel withdrew from the league and disbanded due to lack of financing. They were replaced by Minsk-2, who finished 5th in last year's Second League. Gomelzheldortrans, Second League 4th team, declined invitation due to insufficient financing.

Teams summary

League table

Promotion play-offs
The 11th placed team of 2013 Premier League Dnepr Mogilev played a two-legged relegation play-off against the runners-up of 2013 Belarusian First League Gorodeya for one spot in the 2014 Premier League and won the series 3–1 on aggregate.

Results

Top goalscorers

Updated to games played on 23 November 2013 Source: football.by

See also
2013 Belarusian Premier League
2012–13 Belarusian Cup
2013–14 Belarusian Cup

External links
 Official site 

Belarusian First League seasons
2
Belarus
Belarus